Neuhäusgen or Neuhaeusgen is a village in the commune of Schuttrange, in southern Luxembourg.  , the village had a population of 235.

Schuttrange
Villages in Luxembourg